Neomagdalis is a genus of beetles belonging to the family Curculionidae.

Species:
 Neomagdalis cana Kuschel, 1950 
 Neomagdalis luteipennis Hustache, 1937 
 Neomagdalis unicolor Hustache, 1937

References

Curculionidae
Curculionidae genera